Luge at the 1968 Winter Olympics consisted of three events at Villard-de-Lans.  The competition took place between 11 and 18 February 1968.

Medal summary

Medal table

East Germany led the medal table with three medals, one of each type. This was the first separate Games for East and West Germany, and thus each country's first luge medals.

Events

Participating NOCs
Fourteen nations participated in Luge at the Grenoble Games. Spain, France, Sweden and East and West Germany made their Olympic luge debuts.

Notes

References

 
1968
1968 Winter Olympics events
1968 in luge